Adolphe Édouard Marie Deslandres (22 January 1840 – 30 July 1911) was a French composer and organist.

Life
At the Conservatoire de Paris, he studied counterpoint and fugue with Aimé Leborne and pipe organ with François Benoist. In 1860, he won the Second Grand Prix de Rome with his cantata Ivan IV.

In 1862, he succeeded his father as organist of the Sainte-Marie church. He played on an organ of the Stoltz Frères company, and on a choir organ of the Merklin firm. In addition to his extensive works of sacred music such as the Messe de Saint-André, premiered at Notre Dame de Paris, and his Messe solennelle, Deslandres composed several successful opéras comiques. In 1872, his opera Dimanche et Lundi was premiered at the Opéra-Comique and received the praise of Gounod. The premiere of Le Baiser took place in 1884. His other operas were performed at the Alcazar.

Deslandres also composed some works for organ, piano (an Air de ballet and Études in staccato), a Scherzo for orchestra, and four Méditations for violin, cello, French horn, harp, organ and double bass.

Adolphe Deslandres had two brothers, also musicians, whose careers were interrupted by their premature death. Jules-Laurent Deslandres (15 August 1838 in Batignolles – 1 August 1870) studied at the Conservatoire de Paris where in 1855 he won the first prize for professional double bass. He had been a member of the orchestra of the Opéra de Paris. Georges-Philippe Deslandres (5 May 1849 – 12 October 1875) was a student in the organ class of César Franck at the Conservatoire de Paris. In 1870, he won the second prize for organ. He was organist of the churches of Sainte-Clotilde, Saint-Vincent-de-Paul and Sainte-Marie. Adolphe Deslandres also had a sister, Clémence Deslandres, who was a singer and performed many times the works of her brother.

Adolphe Deslandres died in Paris at age 71 and was buried at Montmartre Cemetery.

Works
 Bajazet et le Joueur de flûte, cantata, 1858
 Ivan IV, cantata, 1860
 Dimanche et Lundi, opera comique, 1872
 Le Chevalier Bijou, opera, 1875
 Fridolin, opera, 1876
 Scherzo for orchestra, 1880
 Les Sept Paroles du Christ, oratorio for baritone, choir, solo violin, cello, harp and organ (after Édouard Laboulaye), 1883
 Le Baiser, opera comique, 1884.
 Stabat Mater for four voices, choir, organ and orchestra, 1885
 Sauvons nos frères, cantata for solo voices, choir and orchestra
 Invocation à Marie
 Offertoire et Communion for organ
 Offertoire pour grand orgue
 Air de ballet for piano
 Études de concert en staccato for piano
 Méditations for violin, cello, horn, harp, organ and double bass
 Ode à l'harmonie
 Introduction et Polonaise pour hautbois et piano.
 Panis Angelicus, tenor solo with horn and organ accompaniment.

References

External links
 Adolphe Deslandres on Discogs
 Introduction et Polonaise - Adolphe Deslandres on YouTube

1840 births
1911 deaths
19th-century classical composers
19th-century French composers
19th-century French male musicians
20th-century French male musicians
Burials at Montmartre Cemetery
Conservatoire de Paris alumni
French classical organists
French composers of sacred music
French opera composers
French Romantic composers
Male opera composers
French male organists
Oratorio composers
Prix de Rome for composition
Male classical organists